Clarina Irene Howard Nichols (January 25, 1810 – January 11, 1885) was a journalist, lobbyist and public speaker involved in all three of the major reform movements of the mid-19th century: temperance, abolition, and the women's movement that emerged largely out of the ranks of the first two.  Though prominent enough in her time to merit her own chapter in Anthony's History of Woman Suffrage, Nichols has been overlooked since 1900 and only recently have her contributions to equal rights undergone a reassessment.

Biography
Born in West Townshend, Vermont in 1810, into a prosperous New England family, Clarina Nichols fell on hard times after a disastrous early marriage. Supporting herself and her children on "women's wages" — one-half to one-third what men received for similar work — she began writing for a newspaper in Brattleboro, Vermont, the Windham County Democrat in 1845. She married the editor and publisher, George Nichols; when he became an invalid, she quietly took over his duties at the paper. Through her new profession, she was introduced to various reform movements of the day — temperance, women's rights, anti-slavery, dress and diet reform — and embraced many of them.

She helped organize the fledgling women's movement in the East. In October 1852, she helped organize the first of several petitions submitted to the Vermont legislature to give women the right to vote in school meetings.

When the Kansas-Nebraska Act of 1854 threatened to establish slavery outside of the South, Clarina Nichols uprooted her family to become a pioneer and activist in Kansas. Her efforts helped catapult her adopted state into the forefront of women's rights, gaining the respect and support of such women as Susan B. Anthony and Elizabeth Cady Stanton. During the course of an ever-busy life, Clarina Nichols served as teacher,  lecturer,  editor,  writer, farmer,  lay doctor and lawyer, government clerk, matron in a home for destitute black children and widows, and conductor on the Underground Railroad. She died in 1885 in California, where she pioneered and agitated to the end.

She was an active Underground Railroad Station Master and Conductor while living in Quindaro, Kansas. She left a letter telling about a time when a Freedom Seeker named Caroline was brought to her house. Caroline's slave master and other slave hunters were camped on the edge of town and looking for her. Clarina tells of hiding Caroline in an empty cistern overnight and then sending her on the road North as soon as it was safe.

See also
Aurelius O. Carpenter, her son

Footnotes

Further reading

 Diane Eickhoff, Revolutionary Heart: Clarina Nichols and the Pioneering Crusade for Women's Rights. Kansas City, KS: Quindaro Press, 2006.  Also released in a YA version as Clarina Nichols: Frontier Crusader for Women's Rights. 
 Marilyn S. Blackwell and Kristen T. Oertel, Frontier Feminist: Clarina Howard Nichols and the Politics of Motherhood. Lawrence, KS: University Press of Kansas, 2010.

External links
 Clarina Nichols, Women's Rights Activist And Journalist
  Biography, from a website created by the University of Kansas and the Kansas State Historical Society
Clarina Irene Howard Nichols Papers. Schlesinger Library , Radcliffe Institute, Harvard University.

American women journalists
American women's rights activists
American lobbyists
1810 births
1885 deaths
People from Brattleboro, Vermont
Underground Railroad people
American temperance activists
19th-century American women writers
19th-century American journalists
Writers from Vermont